Edward Lorenz Sebastian Erautt (September 26, 1924 – October 27, 2013) was an American professional baseball player.

The younger brother of Major League catcher Joe Erautt, Eddie was born in Portland, Oregon, where he attended Lincoln High School. He began his pro career in his native state, with the Salem Senators in 1942, then pitched in 27 games for the 1942–43 Hollywood Stars of the Pacific Coast League before service in the United States Army during World War II. In his first post-war campaign, he won 20 of 34 decisions for the Stars and was acquired by Cincinnati.

Erautt's best big-league season was 1949, when he allowed 99 hits in 112 innings pitched and compiled an earned run average of 3.36 in 39 games, including nine starts. But he allowed 61 bases on balls to 43 strikeouts.  The Reds of Erautt's era were a chronic second-division team and he compiled a poor 12–22 record in 144 total appearances for Cincinnati. As a Cardinal, in 1953, he won three of four decisions, but posted a poor 6.31 ERA.

All told, Erautt allowed 434 hits and 179 bases on balls in 379 MLB innings pitched for a WHIP of 1.62, with 157 strikeouts.

Erautt was, however, a very successful pitcher in the minor leagues, following up his 20-win 1946 campaign with seasons of 21, 18, 16 and 15 victories. He retired after the 1957 season.

References

External links

 Eddie Erautt at SABR (Baseball BioProject)

1924 births
2013 deaths
Baseball players from Portland, Oregon
Cincinnati Reds players
Hollywood Stars players
Kansas City Blues (baseball) players
Major League Baseball pitchers
St. Louis Cardinals players
Salem Senators players
San Diego Padres (minor league) players
Syracuse Chiefs players
Vancouver Mounties players
United States Army personnel of World War II